La giusta distanza, internationally released as The Right Distance, is a 2007 Italian drama film directed by Carlo Mazzacurati.

It entered the competition at the second Rome Film Festival.  The film was later awarded with a Nastro d'argento for best script;  it was also nominated for several David di Donatello awards, including categories for best film and best actress.

Cast
Giovanni Capovilla: Giovanni
Valentina Lodovini: Mara
Ahmed Hafiene: Hassan
Giuseppe Battiston: Amos
Fabrizio Bentivoglio: Bencivegna
Marina Rocco: Eva
Natalino Balasso: Franco
Dario Cantarelli: Tiresia
Ivano Marescotti: lawyer

See also
Movies about immigration to Italy

References

External links

Italian drama films
2000s Italian-language films
2007 films
Films directed by Carlo Mazzacurati
Films about immigration
2007 drama films
Films scored by Mark Orton
2000s Italian films
Fandango (Italian company) films